Elyptron is a genus of moths of the family Noctuidae described by Saalmüller in 1881.

Species
Some species of this genus are:

 Elyptron annularis Viette, 1963
 Elyptron berioi Viette, 1957
 Elyptron catalai Viette, 1963
 Elyptron cinctum Saalmüller, 1891
 Elyptron dallolmoi Berio, 1972
 Elyptron emplecta D. S. Fletcher, 1963
 Elyptron ethiopica Hampson, 1909
 Elyptron leucosticta Hampson, 1909
 Elyptron schroderi Viette, 1963
 Elyptron subleucosticta Strand, 1921
 Elyptron timorosa Berio, 1955

References

Hadeninae